Mercado de Colón or  (Columbus Market) is a public market located in the city center of Valencia, Spain. It is one of the main works of the Valencian Art Nouveau.

Building 

The building was designed by the Valencian architect Francisco Mora Berenguer between 1914 and 1916. It is a clear example of Valencian Art Nouveau architecture of the early century. It was declared national monument. It impresses with its extraordinary facade and lavish decor.

References

External links 

 Website of the Mercado de Colón of Valencia
 View detail of the market's south facade

Retail markets in Spain
Art Nouveau architecture in the Valencian Community
Buildings and structures in Valencia
Tourist attractions in Valencia